Metagame, hypergame, or game about the game, is an approach to a game that transcends or operates outside of the prescribed rules of the game, uses external factors to affect the game, or goes beyond the supposed limits or environment set by the game.

Metagaming might also refer to a game which functions to create or modify the rules of a sub-game. Thus, we might play a metagame selecting which rules will apply during the play of the game itself.

Etymology
The origin of the idea of metagames originally came from the game theory field, with ideas first published in the groundbreaking Theory of Games and Economic Behavior by John von Neumann and Oskar Morgenstern in 1944, though the term itself was not originally used in that work.

The word can be found being used in the context of playing zero-sum games in a publication by the Mental Health Research Institute in 1956.

It is claimed that the first known use of the term was in Nigel Howard's book Paradoxes of Rationality: Theory of Metagames and Political Behavior published in 1971, where Howard used the term in his analysis of the Cold War political landscape using a variation of the Prisoner's Dilemma., however Howard used the term in Metagame Analysis in Political Problems published in 1966. In 1967, the word appeared in a study by Russell Lincoln Ackoff and in the Bulletin of the Operations Research Society of America.

The term gained more recent use towards game design by Richard Garfield, the creator of Magic: The Gathering in a column he wrote for The Duelist in 1995. In a 2000 talk at the Game Developers Conference, Garfield expanded on this, defining "metagame" as "how a game interfaces beyond itself", and asserted that this can include "what you bring to a game, what you take away from a game, what happens between games, [and] what happens during a game". Stephanie Boluk and Patrick Lemieux extend and refine Garfield's term to apply to potentially all forms of play and gaming, arguing that video games in particular are not "games" but rather "equipment for making metagames."

In games

Adaptation to a specific gaming environment
Another game-related use of the term "metagaming" refers to operation on knowledge of the current strategic trends within a game. This usage is common in games that have large, organized play systems or tournament circuits and which feature customized decks of cards, sets of miniatures or other playing pieces for each player. Some examples of this kind of environment are tournament scenes for tabletop or computer collectible card games like Magic: The Gathering,  Gwent: The Witcher Card Game or Hearthstone, tabletop war-gaming such as Warhammer 40,000 and Flames of War, or team-based multiplayer online games such as Star Conflict, Dota 2, League of Legends, and Team Fortress 2. In some games, such as Heroes of the Storm, each battleground has a different metagame.

The metagame in these environments is often affected by new elements added by the game's developers and publishers, such as new card expansions in card games, or adjustments to character abilities in online games. The metagame may also come within player communities as reactions to win over currently-popular strategies, creating ebbs and flows of strategy types over time.

Computer games
Recently the term metagame has come to be used by some players to describe an emergent methodology that is a subset of the basic strategy necessary to play the game at a high level. The definitions of this term are varied but can include "pre-game" theory, behavior prediction, or "ad hoc strategy" depending on the game being played. An example of this would be in StarCraft where a player's previous matches with the same opponent have given them insight into that player's playstyle and may cause them to make certain decisions which would otherwise seem inferior.

Role-playing games

In role-playing games, metagaming is a term often used to describe players' use of assumed characteristics of the game. In particular, metagaming often refers to having an in-game character act on knowledge that the player has access to but the character should not.  For example, tricking Medusa to stare at a mirror when the character has never heard of Medusa and would not be aware of her petrifying stare.

For instance, a player might adjust his character's actions if the player has some foreknowledge of the long-term intentions of the gamemaster, or, more commonly, the gamemaster's tendency to have (or lack of) mercy on players whose characters do things that would cause them to fail at their objectives. A player changing how they play the game based on their knowledge of the gamemaster would be metagaming.

Examples
 A special set of moves in chess can allow a player to win in four moves.  Competitor A has been watching Competitor B play chess, and the past five games in a row Competitor B has attempted to use this four-move win.  When Competitor A sits down to play against Competitor B, Competitor A will be metagaming if they play in a way that will give them an advantage if Competitor B repeats this line.
 In modern computer games, particularly in casual, mobile and tablet games, the out-of-game play achievements which give you bonuses in the game itself are considered metagame elements as they are games outside of the real game. Also known as Reward systems, Achievement games, augmented reality games and gamification.
 Any game with a spectator team that does not participate in gameplay could be prone to metagaming. If a spectator were to reveal information to a team or individual that they could not have gained otherwise, they would be metagaming.
 In popular trading card games, such as Magic: The Gathering, Pokémon Trading Card Game, or Yu-Gi-Oh! Trading Card Game players compete with decks they have created in advance and the "metagame" consists of the deck types that are currently popular and expected to show up in large numbers in a tournament. The knowledge of metagame trends can give players an edge against other participants, both while they are playing by quickly recognizing what kind of deck opponents have and guessing their likely cards or moves, and during the deck building process, by selecting cards that do well against current popular deck types at the possible expense of performance against rarer ones. Another example of metagaming would be bluffing opponents into expecting cards that you do not have, or surprising the competition with novel decks that they may not be prepared for. The secondary market of cards is heavily influenced by metagame trends: cards become more valuable when they are popular, often to the point of scarcity.
 In fighting games, metagaming may occur at the character select screen. The opposing character has various strengths that can be avoided and weaknesses that can be exploited more easily depending on the character you choose provided you are aware of those strengths and weaknesses (called a "match up"). For a basic example, a character with a projectile attack has the advantage over a grappler who must be close to the opponent to be effective. Match up metagaming is very important in tournament settings. In recent fighting games, blind select has been implemented for online modes. This makes it so that neither player can see what character the other player chose. In tournaments, players have the option to opt for a blind select where they tell a judge in confidence the character they intend to select in the match, making their character choice mandatory. A newer trend in more recently released titles is to allow the selection of multiple characters at once which the player can then switch between on the fly, rendering match-up picking excessively hard and virtually impractical.
 In space simulation action games like Star Conflict, Elite: Dangerous and Star Citizen, metagaming occurs in selecting the ship class, weapons, shields and active ship modules in regard to game mode or the kind of team play. Metagaming in the player vs player mode (PvP) plans and realizes ship builds and teamplay mechanics according to the most damaging weapons, the escapes available to ships, the duration of crowd control effects, etc. The abbreviation meta may refer to a term in gamer slang for what works currently on the highest competitive level and what is the leading type of ships or multiplayer strategy, for example. 
 Many logic puzzles allow an analogue of metagaming.  By convention, logic puzzles are only considered well-constructed if they have a unique solution.  When solving a puzzle, one might notice that if a certain candidate symbol were placed in one square, there would be multiple ways to complete another part of the puzzle, and no extra information could possibly decide between them.  Ruling out that candidate on these grounds might be classed as metagaming if the existence of a single solution were merely a convention rather than a rule.
 In the cooperative card game Hanabi virtually all the strategy is dependent on metagame, such as the widespread convention that players discard unclued cards from a fixed side of their hand and add new cards from the opposite side. The metagame can go several levels deep. For instance, one may indicate that an unclued card just added to a hand is a playable 3-White by cluing the 4-White in a different player's hand (this is known as "finesse"). But if a player is aware that everyone in the game is familiar with finesse, they may merely pretend to finesse in order to get some other card played: perhaps it was not a 3-White, but some other card that was nonetheless also playable.
In repeated, competitive, multiplayer games in which players can team up to gain an advantage, gamers who betray their allies too often may be mistrusted, making it difficult to form partnerships in subsequent games.
 Nigel Howard defines metagame as a decision-making process that derives from the analysis of possible outcomes depending on external variables that alter a problem.

See also
Calvinball
Emergent gameplay
Melvin Dresher
Metagame analysis
Mornington Crescent
Nomic
Pervasive game
Poietic Generator

References

Gaming
Game theory
Game terminology